Triangle North Executive Airport  is a county-owned, public-use airport in Franklin County, North Carolina, United States. It is located five nautical miles (9 km) southwest of the central business district of Louisburg, North Carolina.

It was known as the Franklin County Regional Airport until November 2008, when the Board of Commissioners of Franklin County approved the new name. As of February 2010, Federal Aviation Administration records give the airport's name as Franklin County Airport.

Although most U.S. airports use the same three-letter location identifier for the FAA and IATA, this airport is assigned LHZ by the FAA and LFN by the IATA. The airport's ICAO identifier is KLHZ.

Facilities and aircraft 
It has one runway designated 5/23 with an asphalt surface measuring 5,498 by 100 feet (1,676 x 30 m).

For the 12-month period ending July 1, 2008, the airport had 62,800 aircraft operations, an average of 171 per day: 96% general aviation and 4% military. At that time there were 65 aircraft based at this airport: 83% single-engine, 6% multi-engine, 2% jet and 9% helicopter.

References

External links 
  at North Carolina DOT airport guide
 Aerial photo as of February 1999 from USGS The National Map
 

Airports in North Carolina
Transportation in Franklin County, North Carolina
Buildings and structures in Franklin County, North Carolina